2022 in arthropod palentology is a list of new arthropod fossil taxa, including arachnids, crustaceans, insects, trilobites, and other arthropods that were announced or described, as well as other significant arthropod paleontological discoveries and events which occurred in 2022.

Arachnids

Arachnid research
 Shanks & Selden (2022) describe the first trigonotarbid specimens from the Carboniferous Shelburn Formation of Indiana and Senora Formation of Oklahoma.
 A study on the anatomy of Protoischnurus axelrodorum is published by Carvalho et al. (2022), who interpret this scorpion as a probable early member of the crown group of Iurida, possibly a stem hormurid.
 Xuan, Cai & Huang (2022) describe two immature scorpions from the Cretaceous amber from Myanmar, assigned to the genus Chaerilus.
 Revision of recluse spiders from the Dominican amber is published by Magalhaes et al. (2022), who transfer the species "Loxosceles" aculicaput to the family Drymusidae and to the genus Drymusa.

Crustaceans

Malacostracans

Malacostracan research
 Description of the fossil material of members of Pygocephalomorpha from the Carboniferous Piesberg quarry (Lower Saxony, Germany), including a record of Anthracaris gracilis which was previously reported from the Mazon Creek fossil beds (Illinois, United States) and from Bickershaw (Lancashire, United Kingdom), and a study on the distribution of eumalacostracan crustaceans from Carboniferous deposits of North America and Europe is published by Pazinato et al. (2022).
 Redescription of Oncopareia bredai and a revision of other species previously referred to the genus Oncopareia is published by Tshudy et al. (2022).
 A study on the evolution of carapace morphology of hermit crabs and changes of composition of their assemblages through time is published by Fraaije et al. (2022), who reinstate Probeebeidae as a distinct family, and name a new family Paguropsidae.
 A study on sexual dimorphism and intersex specimens in the population of hundreds of specimens of the Cretaceous crab Dakoticancer overanus Jones, Schweitzer & Feldmann (2022).
 Ossó et al. (2022) report the first known fossil material of Pleolobites from the Paleocene (Thanetian) of Togo, and reevaluate the phylogenetic affinities of this and other fossil portunoid crabs.
 A concretion containing an adult and a juvenile individual of Trichopeltarion greggi, representing the first association of an adult female and a juvenile crab of the same species in the fossil record reported to date, is described from the Miocene Greta Siltstone (New Zealand) by Feldmann & Schweitzer (2022), who interpret this finding as possible evidence of maternal care of juveniles.

Ostracods

Other crustaceans

Other crustacean research
 Collareta et al. (2022) describe borings on a sea turtle carapace from the Miocene (Tortonian) Pisco Formation (Peru), interpreted as probable attachment scars produced by turtle barnacles, and argue that sea turtles may have hosted barnacle symbionts as early as during the early Oligocene.

Insects

Radiodonts

Radiodont research
 New information on the anatomy of Stanleycaris hirpex, based on data from 268 specimens from the Cambrian Burgess Shale (British Columbia, Canada), is presented by Moysiuk & Caron (2022), who report exquisite preservation of the brain of this radiodont and unexpected presence of a large median eye.

Trilobites

Trilobite research
 A study on patterns of segment allocation and expression in the bodies of trilobites throughout their evolutionary history is published by Hopkins & To (2022), who argue that neither taxonomic turnover nor enrolment behaviour of trilobites can sufficiently explain the studied changes of segmentation patterns.
 A study on the early evolutionary history of trilobites is published by Holmes & Budd (2022), who argue that the first appearance datum of trilobites in the fossil record closely reflects their evolutionary origins, and that there is no compelling evidence to suggest an extended cryptic evolutionary history for this group.
 Bicknell et al. (2022) describe malformed trilobite specimens from the Cambrian Beetle Creek Formation (Australia), Chisholm Formation (Nevada, United States) and Wheeler Formation (Utah, United States) and from the Ordovician Llanfawr Mudstones (Wales, United Kingdom), and attempt to determine the origin of the studied injuries.
 A study on the injured specimens of Redlichia takooensis and Redlichia rex from the Cambrian Emu Bay Shale (Australia) is published by Bicknell et al. (2022), who argue that R. rex was likely the chief producer of the injuries in the studied specimen and of large shelly coprolites in the Emu Bay Shale biota, and represents one of the earliest cannibalistic trilobites.
 Losso & Ortega-Hernández (2022) report evidence of the presence of significantly modified and reduced endopodites underneath the seventh thoracic and first pygidial tergites of Olenoides serratus and interpret these appendages as likely functional analogs to claspers.
 A study on the phylogenetic relationships of members of the olenid group Hypermecaspidinae is published by Monti, Tortello & Confalonieri (2022).
 Revision of Ordovician trilobite collections from Shan State (Myanmar) and Yunnan (China), first described by F.R.C. Reed, is published by Fortey, Wernette & Hughes (2022).
 A study on the growth and mortality of Triarthrus eatoni, reevaluating the data presented by Cisne (1973), is published by Pauly & Holmes (2022).
 Edgecombe & Fortey (2022) describe a specimen of Asaphellus tataensis from the Fezouata Formation (Morocco) preserved with antennae bearing a series of round, dome-shaped organs of uncertain homology and function, larger than sensilla on the antennae of other arthropods.
 A study on the degree and structure of modularity in the heads of Calyptaulax annulata and Cloacaspis senilis is published by Vargas-Parra & Hopkins (2022), who consider the best modularity models to be those in which the eyes and anteriormost cranidium formed a single module, or belonged to two modules that highly covaried relative to other modules.
 Bicknell & Smith (2022) seven new abnormal specimens of Odontopleura (Sinespinaspis) markhami from the Silurian (Telychian) Cotton Formation (Australia), interpreting their abnormalities as teratological developments through genetic malfunctions, and evaluate likely causes of abnormalities in Silurian trilobite specimens in general.
 A study on the distribution patterns of Devonian trilobites from Morocco and northwestern Algeria through time and space is published by Bault, Crônier & Bignon (2022).
 A study on the morphological diversity and possible relationship between morphology and environmental and/or ecological factors in Devonian trilobites from North Africa is published by Bault, Crônier & Monnet (2022).
 A study on changes in global distribution of trilobites during the late Paleozoic is published by Brezinski (2022).
 A study on functional morphology, coaptation and palaeoecology of selected acastid trilobites was published by Van Viersen & Kloc (2022).
 A study on the morphological diversity of cephalic sclerites of asteropygine acastids throughout their evolutionary history is published by Martin et al. (2022).

Other arthropods

 Redescription of Chuandianella ovata, based on data from new specimens from the Yu’anshan Member of the Chiungchussu Formation (Cambrian Stage 3; Yunnan, China) preserving unprecedented details of their soft anatomy, is published by Zhai et al. (2022).
 A study on the ventral aspect of head organization of Jianfengia multisegmentalis, and on its evolutionary significance, is published by Zhang et al. (2022).
 Redescription of Triopus draboviensis is published by Van Roy, Rak & Fatka (2022), who also provide a revised diagnosis for Cheloniellida, and exclude Parioscorpio venator from this clade.
 Redescription of the ventral morphology of Retifacies abnormalis and a study on the implications of this taxon for the knowledge of the relationships and evolution of Cambrian artiopods is published by Zhang et al. (2022).
 A study on the appendicular organization in Pygmaclypeatus daziensis and on its ecological and evolutionary implications is published by Schmidt et al. (2022).
 Description of the organization of the central nervous system of a specimen of Mollisonia symmetrica from the Burgess Pass (Burgess Shale; British Columbia, Canada) is published by Ortega-Hernández et al. (2022).
 A study on the evolutionary stability in the history of fossil and living xiphosurids is published by Bicknell et al. (2022).
 Revision of Australian xiphosurids Austrolimulus fletcheri, Dubbolimulus peetae, Tasmaniolimulus patersoni and Victalimulus mcqueeni, and a study on the temporal range of these taxa is published by Bicknell et al. (2022), who reinterpret T. patersoni as living in the Triassic rather than Permian.
 New specimen of Vaderlimulus tricki, providing new information on the anatomy of this xiphosuran and representing the first record of muscles in an austrolimulid reported to date, is described from the Olenekian Thaynes Group (Idaho, United States) by Lerner & Lucas (2022).
 A study on the ontogenetic stages, allometry and ecology of Paleolimulus kunguricus is published by Naugolnykh & Bicknell (2022).
 A study on the anatomy of the chelicerae of Slimonia acuminata, based on data from a new specimen, is published by Lamsdell (2022).
 Braddy & Gass (2022) redescribe tracks from the Ordovician Martinsburg Formation (New York, United States) assigned to the ichnotaxon Palmichnium gallowayi, attribute these tracks to a medium-sized stylonurid eurypterid, and interpret them as the earliest trace fossil evidence for mass migrations of eurypterids into nearshore environments to molt and mate.
 Biomechanical study of the chelicerae of pterygotid eurypterids is published by Bicknell et al. (2022), who argue that pterygotid chelicerae were functionally analogous to scorpion chelae, and that Erettopterus bilobus and Pterygotus anglicus had a generalised diet and were apex predators of their ecosystems, while Acutiramus bohemicus was adapted to piercing and slicing the cuticle of other eurypterids, and Jaekelopterus rhenaniae was adapted to capturing large, highly mobile, armoured prey.
 New fossil material of Tuzoia with exceptionally preserved soft tissues is described from the Cambrian Burgess Shale (Canada) by Izquierdo-López & Caron (2022), who interpret this arthropod as adapted to predation or scavenging while swimming along the seafloor, and interpret it as an early member of Hymenocarina.
 A study on the functional morphology of Ercaicunia multinodosa, aiming to determine the posture used by this arthropod to overcome resistance and to obtain most lift while sliding in the water column, is published by Li et al. (2022).
 A study describing Acheronauta stimulapis also conducted studies on the thylacocephalans and Parioscorpio, and found that the thylacocephalans were  a group of stem-mandibulates more basal than the crown-group crustaceans and myriapods, and that Parioscorpio sat in-between the groups Artiopoda and the Mandibulata (2022).

General research
 Review of the paleontological, phylogenomic and molecular clock evidence pertaining to the possibly Cambrian terrestrialization of the arthropods is published Tihelka et al. (2022).

References 

2022 in paleontology